Winklern bei Oberwölz is a former municipality in the district of Murau in the Austrian state of Styria. Since the 2015 Styria municipal structural reform, it is part of the municipality Oberwölz.

Geography
Winklern lies about 12 km northeast of Murau.

References

Cities and towns in Murau District